Berbes is one of nine parishes (administrative divisions) in Ribadesella, a municipality within the province and autonomous community of Asturias, in northern Spain.

External links
Town Hall of Ribadesella(Berbes)

Parishes in Ribadesella